Fort Bidwell is a census-designated place in Modoc County, California. Its population is 180 as of the 2020 census, up from 173 from the 2010 census.

Geography

Fort Bidwell is located near the north end of the Surprise Valley. The Fort Bidwell Indian Community is affiliated with the Paiute nation.

According to the United States Census Bureau, the CDP covers an area of 3.2 square miles (8.3 km), 99.48% of it land, and 0.52% of it water.

Climate
This region experiences warm (but not hot) and dry summers, with no average monthly temperatures above 71.6 °F.  According to the Köppen Climate Classification system, Fort Bidwell has a warm-summer Mediterranean climate, abbreviated "Csb" on climate maps.

Communications

Wired telephone numbers in the community follow the format (530) 279-2xxx or 279-6xxx and appear to be served out of the Cedarville central office. Wired telephone service is provided by Citizens Utilities.

History

In 1865, General John Bidwell backed a petition from settlers at Red Bluff, California to protect Red Bluff's trail to the Owhyhee Mines of Idaho. The U.S. Army commissioned seven forts for this purpose, and dispatched a Major Williamson in April to explore a site for a fort in either Goose Lake Valley or Surprise Valley, from which he selected a site near Fandango Pass at the base of the Warner Mountains in the north end of Surprise Valley, and orders to build the fort were issued on June 10, 1865. Although Surprise Valley settlers desired Army protection, ranchers dispossessed of lands for the fort complained, and claimed damages from the Army.

The fort was built in 1865 amid escalating fighting with the Snake Indians of eastern Oregon and southern Idaho. It was a base for operations in the Snake War that lasted until 1868, the Battle of Infernal Caverns in 1867 with General George Crook, the Modoc War of 1872–73 and the Bannock and Nez Perce campaigns.  Although traffic dwindled on the Red Bluff route once the Central Pacific Railroad extended into Nevada in 1868, the Army staffed Fort Bidwell to quell various uprisings and disturbances until 1890.

Both Fort Bidwell and Camp Bidwell, near Chico were named for General John Bidwell. However, Camp Bidwell was commissioned in 1863, renamed Camp Chico by the time Fort Bidwell was commissioned in 1865, and was decommissioned in 1893.  Observing confusion between the two, Robert W. Pease explained that such a transfer of name between outposts was a common Army practice of the time.

The Fort Bidwell post office opened in 1868.  A 1913 book described Fort Bidwell as having a population of about 200, and containing a school and reservation for the Northern Paiute Kidütökadö band (Gidu Ticutta - ‘Yellow-bellied marmot-Eaters’, also called "Northern California Paiute").

Fort Bidwell is now registered as California Historical Landmark #430.

Demographics

The 2010 United States Census reported that Fort Bidwell had a population of 173. The racial makeup of Fort Bidwell was 75 (43.4%) White, 2 (1.2%) African American, 76 (43.9%) Native American, 0 (0.0%) Asian, 0 (0.0%) Pacific Islander, 10 (5.8%) from other races, and 10 (5.8%) from two or more races. Hispanic or Latino of any race were 23 persons (13.3%).

The Census reported that 173 people (100% of the population) lived in households.

There were 79 households, out of which 17 (21.5%) had children under the age of 18 living in them, 24 (30.4%) were opposite-sex married couples living together, 16 (20.3%) had a female householder with no husband present, 3 (3.8%) had a male householder with no wife present.  There were 7 (8.9%) unmarried opposite-sex partnerships, and 0 (0%) same-sex married couples or partnerships. 30 households (38.0%) were made up of individuals, and 14 (17.7%) had someone living alone who was 65 years of age or older. The average household size was 2.19.  There were 43 families (54.4% of all households); the average family size was 2.95.

The population was spread out, with 35 people (20.2%) under the age of 18, 26 people (15.0%) aged 18 to 24, 29 people (16.8%) aged 25 to 44, 51 people (29.5%) aged 45 to 64, and 32 people (18.5%) who were 65 years of age or older.  The median age was 41.5 years. For every 100 females, there were 80.2 males.  For every 100 females age 18 and over, there were 86.5 males.

The homeowner vacancy rate was 14.5%; the rental vacancy rate was 12.8%.  80 people (46.2% of the population) lived in owner-occupied housing units and 93 people (53.8%) lived in rental housing units.

Politics

See also
Fort Bidwell Indian Community of the Fort Bidwell Reservation of California

References

External links
 The California Military Museum: Historic California Posts: Fort Bidwell(Camp Bidwell)

Census-designated places in Modoc County, California
Bidwell
Bidwell
Closed installations of the United States Army
Census-designated places in California
Snake War